New Zealand competed at the 2011 World Championships in Athletics from August 27 to September 4 in Daegu, South Korea.

Team selection

Reigning World Shot Put champion Valerie Adams leads the initial team selection for the championships.  Adams, who also claimed the 2007 World title and 2008 Olympic Gold, was one of four 2010 Commonwealth Games medalists to be named in the first portion of Athletics New Zealand's selection process. Further selections will be announced in June and the final team selection will be announced after 8 August 2011.

The final team on the entry list comprises the names of 8 athletes.

Medalists
The following competitors from New Zealand won medals at the Championships

Results

Men

Decathlon

Women

References

External links
Official local organising committee website
Official IAAF competition website

Nations at the 2011 World Championships in Athletics
World Championships in Athletics
New Zealand at the World Championships in Athletics